Cathedral of the Dormition of the Theotokos or Cathedral of the Dormition of the Mother of God may refer to:

 Cathedral of Dormition of St. Mary (Berat), Albania
 Cathedral of the Dormition, Sofia, Bulgaria
 Dormition of the Mother of God Cathedral, Varna, Bulgaria
 Dormition Cathedral, Helsinki or Uspenski Cathedral, Finland
 Cathedral of the Dormition, Kutaisi or Bagrati Cathedral, Georgia
 Cathedral of the Dormition, Tbilisi or Tbilisi Sioni Cathedral, Georgia
 Dormition of the Theotokos Cathedral, Cluj-Napoca, Romania
 Dormition of the Theotokos Cathedral, Giurgiu, the seat of the Romanian Orthodox Bishop of Giurgiu, Romania
 Dormition of the Theotokos Cathedral, Satu Mare, a Romanian Orthodox religious building in Satu Mare, Romania
 Dormition Cathedral, Moscow, Russia
 Dormition Cathedral, Vladimir, Russia
 Dormition Cathedral in Smolensk, Russia
 Dormition Cathedral, Staraya Ladoga, Russia
 Dormition Cathedral, Omsk, one of the largest churches in Siberia
 Dormition Cathedral, Khabarovsk, Russia
 Dormition Cathedral, Kharkiv, Ukraine
 Cathedral of the Dormition (Pechersk Lavra), part of the Kyiv Pechersk Lavra monastery in Ukraine
 Birmingham Orthodox Cathedral, formally Cathedral Church of the Dormition of the Mother of God and St. Andrew, Birmingham, United Kingdom
Dormition Cathedral, London, Russian Orthodox cathedral also known as Cathedral of the Dormition of the Mother of God and All Saints
St Mary's Greek Orthodox Church, Wood Green, London, United Kingdom, also known as The Greek Orthodox Cathedral of the Dormition of the Mother of God

See also 
 Cathedral of the Assumption (disambiguation)
 Church of the Dormition of the Theotokos (disambiguation)
 Monastery of the Dormition of the Theotokos (disambiguation)
 Cathedral of the Theotokos (disambiguation)
 Dormition of the Theotokos (disambiguation)
 Dormition (disambiguation)
 Assumption (disambiguation)